Magdalena Gorzkowska (born 30 April 1992) is a Polish 400 metres sprinter turned mountaineer. As an athlete she was a silver medallist in the 4 × 400 metres relay at the 2016 IAAF World Indoor Championships. She holds a personal best of 52.95 seconds for the 400 m. Her accomplishments in mountaineering include ascents of Mont Blanc, Aconcagua, Kilimanjaro, Mount Everest (as the youngest Polish female) and Makalu (first Polish female without supplemental oxygen).

Biography
Born in Bytom and a member of TS AKS Chorzów athletics club, she made her first international appearances with the Polish 4 × 400 metres relay team. They placed eighth at the 2010 World Junior Championships in Athletics then she took her first medal, a silver, at the 2011 European Athletics Junior Championships. A senior debut followed at the 2012 European Athletics Championships, where she ran individually (coming 20th overall) and was eighth in the relay final. Later that season she was part of the Polish delegation for the 2012 Summer Olympics in London but was not selected to run in the relay. An appearance at the 2013 European Athletics U23 Championships brought Gorzkowska her first title, as she led off a team Małgorzata Hołub, Agnieszka Karczmarczyk and Justyna Święty.

Gorzkowska received her first senior medal at the 2016 IAAF World Indoor Championships. Teaming up again with Hołub and Święty and joined by Ewelina Ptak, the Polish quartet held off a challenge from Romania to take the silver medals behind the host nation, the United States.

International competitions

References

External links

Living people
1992 births
Sportspeople from Bytom
Polish female sprinters
Polish mountain climbers
World Athletics Indoor Championships medalists